Grant Anderson is a former weightlifter and Highland Games competitor from Scotland. He won a bronze medal at the Commonwealth Games in 1970 in the heavyweight class of the weightlifting but was more prominent as a Highland Games competitor, in which capacity he won the inaugural World Highland Games Championships in 1980 in Los Angeles.

Biography
Born in Dundee, Anderson was well educated and trained to become a town planner. As an amateur athlete he excelled in field athletics and strength-based sports and specialised in weightlifting. As a weightlifter he competed in the 1970 Commonwealth Games in the superheavyweight class, the first time that class had been introduced to the games, and won the bronze medal. He then began to compete as a Highland Games specialist against his namesake, but no relation, Bill Anderson. In 1979 he competed in the first ever Britain's Strongest Man, won by Geoff Capes, nominally as a well-known name on the Highland Games circuit than for his prowess as a weightlifter. The following year, in 1980, he won the inaugural World Highland Games Championships and came third in that event in 1981. In 1982 he won it a second time in Prestonpans, Scotland, underlying his status.

References

Living people
Year of birth missing (living people)
Scottish strength athletes
Scottish male weightlifters
Commonwealth Games bronze medallists for Scotland
Sportspeople from Dundee
Scottish sportsmen
Weightlifters at the 1970 British Commonwealth Games
Commonwealth Games medallists in weightlifting
Scottish urban planners
Medallists at the 1970 British Commonwealth Games